United Nations Security Council resolution 1604, adopted unanimously on 15 June 2005, after reaffirming all resolutions on the situation in Cyprus, particularly Resolution 1251 (1999), the Council extended the mandate of the United Nations Peacekeeping Force in Cyprus (UNFICYP) for an additional period until 15 December 2005.

Observations
The security council called on both Cyprus and Northern Cyprus to urgently address the humanitarian issue of missing persons. It welcomed the Secretary-General Kofi Annan's review of UNFICYP as requested in Resolution 1568 (2004) and his assessment that violence on the island was unlikely, as well as his intention to keep the operation under review. The council welcomed the lifting of restrictions on the freedom of movement of UNFICYP by the Turkish side and the good co-operation from both sides, though there was concern at the level of crime across the ceasefire line.

The resolution also welcomed the continued funding of the United Nations operations by the governments of Cyprus and Greece.

Acts
Extending UNFICYP's mandate, the resolution requested the secretary-general to report to the council on the implementation of the current resolution, further endorsing UNFICYP's efforts to implement the sexual exploitation policy. It urged the Turkish Cypriot side to restore the military status quo at Strovilia prior to 30 June 2000.

See also
 Annan Plan for Cyprus
 Annan Plan referendum
 Cyprus dispute
 List of United Nations Security Council Resolutions 1601 to 1700 (2005–2006)
 United Nations Buffer Zone in Cyprus
 Turkish invasion of Cyprus

References

External links
 
Text of the Resolution at undocs.org

 1604
 1604
2005 in Cyprus
2000s in Cypriot politics
June 2005 events